Fate Takes a Hand is a 1961 British anthology drama film.

Plot
The recovery of a mail bag stolen in a robbery 15 years before has varying consequences on the lives of five of the recipients of the letters, when the post office decide that the mail should be delivered. Several lives are changed, as witnessed by a newspaper reporter, accompanied by a post office security officer, who decide to follow up on several of the letters.

Cast

Ronald Howard as Tony
Christina Gregg as Karon
Basil Dignam as Wheeler
Willoughby Goddard as Rollenshaw
Jack Watson as Bulldog
Peter Butterworth as Ronnie
Mary Laura Wood as Sandra
Noel Trevarthen as Bob
Sheila Whittingham as Jenny
Michael Peake as Ross
Laidman Browne as Maxwell
Derek Blomfield as Briggs
Valerie Gearon as Peggy
Valentine Dyall as Wilson
John Gabriel as Matt Little
Brian Cobby as Mark
Peter Swanwick as Preeny
Bruce Beeby as Inspector Phillips
Arnold Bell as Finch
Michael Anthony as Fuller
Carl Duering as Mike
Liza Page as Lola
Reginald Hearne as Warder
Peter Bennett as Max
Angela Douglas as Secretary
Robert Webber as Wayne
Eric Dodson as Janitor
Gilda Emmanueli as Sally
Larry Noble as Tough
Andrew Kane as Young Boxer
Martin Wyldeck as Doctor

Critical reception
AllMovie called it "a throwback to the British "portmanteau" films of the 1950s"; while TV Guide gave the film two out of four stars, and wrote, "the effect of the late letters' delivery to the recipients makes for five delightful little tales. Good performances all the way around."

References

External links

1961 films
British drama films
1961 drama films
British anthology films
1960s English-language films
1960s British films